FC Bristol is a football club based in Almondsbury, near Bristol, England.

History
Formed in 2008 as Lebeq United, the club joined the Bristol and Suburban League and worked their way up through the divisions before winning the Premier Division One title in 2015–16. They were subsequently promoted to the Gloucestershire County League, and were runners-up in their second season, before winning the title in 2018–19 despite having six points deducted.

They were promoted to Western League Division One for 2019–20, at Step 6 of the National League System.

In July 2022, Lebeq United changed their name to FC Bristol.

Honours
Gloucestershire County League
Champions 2018–19
Bristol & Suburban League
Premier Division champions 2015–16

References

External links
Official website

Football clubs in England
Football clubs in Gloucestershire
Football clubs in Bristol
Bristol and Suburban Association Football League
Gloucestershire County Football League
Western Football League
Association football clubs established in 2008
2008 establishments in England